The St Mungo Cup was a greyhound competition held at Shawfield Stadium in Glasgow.

It was inaugurated in 1927 at Carntyne Stadium and established itself as one of the leading events in Scotland. Following the closure of Carntyne in 1971 the event was switched to Shawfield in 1973.

The race was discontinued after the 2009 running but was re-introduced for a one off running in 2016.

Past winners

Discontinued

Venues & Distances
1927-1971 (Carntyne 500y) 
1955-1956 (Not held)
1975-2009 (Shawfield 480m) 
2010-2015 (Not held)
2016-2016 (Shawfield 480m)
Discontinued

Sponsors
2005-2007 Jordan Electrics 
2008-2008 XL Limousine
2009-2009 ibetx.com
2016-2016 Kai Laidlaw

References

External links

Greyhound racing competitions in the United Kingdom
Greyhound racing in Scotland
Recurring sporting events established in 1936
Sports competitions in Glasgow